Octavia St. Laurent Mizrahi (March 16, 1964 – May 17, 2009) was an American model and AIDS educator who was active in New York City's Black and Latino ballroom community and Harlem's luxurious balls. They came to public attention after being featured in the 1990 documentary Paris Is Burning.

Career 
St. Laurent began walking in the New York ballroom scene in 1982 and acknowledged that their favourite category to walk in was Face. One of the most common songs they'd walk to was "Swept Away" by Diana Ross.

They were a central figure of the 1990 documentary Paris Is Burning and had a small role in The Saint of Fort Washington (1993).

In 2006, they starred in Wolfgang Busch's How Do I Look, dubbed as "the sequel to Paris is Burning", and was using the name Heavenly Angel Octavia St Laurent Manolo Blahnik.

Personal life
St. Laurent was born in Brooklyn, New York, on March 16, 1964. In her youth, Octavia identified as a trans woman, but had a very different view on her gender and when asked if she were a man, she would proudly claim "ABSOLUTELY" which quickly shut up her hecklers, and often stunned many in the trans community. She was born producing more estrogen than most people assigned male at birth.

Octavia said that growing up, her parents were accepting: "I had wonderful parents that supported me. My sexuality was not an issue with my parents. They were accustomed to that since I was a child. People thought I looked like a little girl, and my mother said: 'This is a boy!

Octavia experienced police harassment and was arrested on several occasions for wearing gender-nonconforming clothing in public.

St. Laurent was diagnosed as HIV+, and would later serve as an educator to spread awareness about the disease. During their appearance in Wolfgang Busch's LGBT documentary How Do I Look, St. Laurent further discussed their drug use, sex work, and fight with AIDS.

St. Laurent was good friends with Willi Ninja and Paris Dupree.

In 2008, Octavia was diagnosed with cancer. Octavia moved in with their sister while receiving treatment and started a one-woman show at Spirits gay bar in Syracuse, New York, which they described as a quiet place for respite. Octavia gave a final interview by phone in March 2009. Octavia died after a long battle with cancer on May 17, 2009, in Syracuse, New York, aged 45. Octavia is buried in a cemetery in Queens, New York.

Acknowledgements 
St. Laurent's appearance in Paris Is Burning was cited in Judith Butler's book Bodies That Matter in "Gender is Burning".

St. Laurent was posthumously quoted in the television series credits of Pose (2019) season 2, episode 4: "Never Knew Love Like This Before", written by Ryan Murphy and Janet Mock, with the following: "Gays have rights, lesbians have rights, men have rights, women have rights, even animals have rights. How many of us have to die before the community recognizes that we are not expendable?"

Quotes 

 This is me, you understand? No, I am not a woman. No, I am not a man. I am Octavia.
Life is like a boomerang. When you throw it, it eventually comes back to you.
 If money wasn't important in the world to survive, I guess I wouldn't want anything but what I have now. But since money does, I hope that the way I look puts money in my pocket.
 Live life. Live life and do not take anything for granted. Because what you have today can instantly be gone tomorrow. And don't settle for nothing but... ...'and donʼt settle for nothing but the best.'
 Gays have rights, lesbians have rights, men have rights, women have rights, even animals have rights. How many of us have to die before the community recognizes that we are not expendable?

Filmography

References

External links

Octavia St. Laurent " Queen Of The Underground " WINNER 2010 PILL AWARD

1964 births
2009 deaths
Deaths from cancer in New York (state)
American LGBT entertainers
Transgender entertainers
Transgender women
LGBT African Americans
House of St. Laurent
Actresses from New York City
20th-century African-American women
20th-century African-American people
Intersex non-binary people
LGBT models
Intersex models
Non-binary models
20th-century LGBT people